The 2003 Western Michigan Broncos football team represented Western Michigan University in the Mid-American Conference (MAC) during the 2003 NCAA Division I-A football season.  In their seventh season under head coach Gary Darnell, the Broncos compiled a 7–5 record (5–3 against MAC opponents), finished in a tie for third place in the MAC's West Division, and were outscored by their opponents, 370 to 331.  The team played its home games in Waldo Stadium in Kalamazoo, Michigan.

The team's statistical leaders included Chad Munson with 2,123 passing yards, Philip Reed with 744 rushing yards, and Greg Jennings with 1,050 receiving yards. Linebacker Jason Babin was selected by The Sporting News as a second-team All-American.

Schedule

Roster

References

Western Michigan
Western Michigan Broncos football seasons
Western Michigan Broncos football